Kelly Ann Keiderling-Franz (born 1966) is an American diplomat who served as the United States Ambassador to Uruguay from 2016 to 2019.

Early life and education
Keiderling was born in the Dominican Republic. Keiderling's father was in the U.S. foreign service and had met her Bolivian mother on his first international assignment in Cochabamba, Bolivia. Keiderling grew up primarily in Latin America and Portugal.

Keiderling earned a bachelor's degree from Georgetown University and later a master's degree from the National War College.

Career

Keiderling joined the foreign service in 1988. Her U.S. assignments included ones as Senior Panama Desk officer, Public Diplomacy Desk Officer for the Caribbean, acting deputy director for Central American Affairs, Strategic Language Issues Coordinator in the Bureau of Human Resources, Chief of Staff in the Iraq Office, and Principal Deputy Assistant Secretary for the Bureau of Educational and Cultural Affairs. Her foreign assignments have included serving as Deputy Chief of Mission in Chișinău, Moldova. She has served as Public Affairs Officer in Cuba, Botswana and Kyrgyzstan. Her other international assignments include ones in the Dominican Republic, Ethiopia, and Zambia.

In 2013, Venezuelan president Nicolás Maduro expelled Keiderling and two other US diplomats from the country.

When tapped by President Obama to become United States Ambassador to Uruguay. She was confirmed by the Senate on May 17, 2016. She assumed her role on June 23, 2016. Her appointment as Ambassador ended on June 29, 2019. Keiderling was Principal Deputy Assistant Secretary at the United States Department of State’s Bureau of Educational and Cultural Affairs (ECA), a role she had held since December 2013.

Personal life
Keiderling is married to David Franz, a foreign service officer, and they have two children. In addition to English, she speaks Spanish, Portuguese, French and Russian, as well as some Italian and Romanian.

References

1966 births
Living people
Ambassadors of the United States to Venezuela
Ambassadors of the United States to Uruguay
American women ambassadors
Georgetown University alumni
American people of Bolivian descent
American politicians of Bolivian descent
Hispanic and Latino American diplomats
National War College alumni
Obama administration personnel
United States Foreign Service personnel
21st-century American women